Alison Kay Heather is a New Zealand physiology academic and full professor at the University of Otago.

Academic career
After obtaining her PhD in 1996 from the University of Sydney for a thesis entitled Between feast and famine: adaptation of Escherichia coli to growth on low carbohydrate concentrations, Heather moved to the University of Technology Sydney, then to the University of Otago, rising to full professor.

Heather competes in ultra-long-distance running events and triathlons. Her area of specialisation is the effect of sex hormones on non-reproductive tissues, which includes use of sex hormones and related substances in sports doping.

Selected works 

 Liu, Peter Y., Alison K. Death, and David J. Handelsman. "Androgens and cardiovascular disease." Endocrine reviews 24, no. 3 (2003): 313–340.
 Death, Alison K., Elizabeth J. Fisher, Kristine CY McGrath, and Dennis K. Yue. "High glucose alters matrix metalloproteinase expression in two key vascular cells: potential impact on atherosclerosis in diabetes." Atherosclerosis 168, no. 2 (2003): 263–269.
 Fryirs, Michelle A., Philip J. Barter, Mathiyalagan Appavoo, Bernard E. Tuch, Fatiha Tabet, Alison K. Heather, and Kerry-Anne Rye. "Effects of high-density lipoproteins on pancreatic β-cell insulin secretion." Arteriosclerosis, thrombosis, and vascular biology 30, no. 8 (2010): 1642–1648.
 McCrohon, Jane A., Alison K. Death, Shirley Nakhla, Wendy Jessup, David J. Handelsman, Keith K. Stanley, and David S. Celermajer. "Androgen receptor expression is greater in macrophages from male than from female donors: a sex difference with implications for atherogenesis." Circulation 101, no. 3 (2000): 224–226.
 Mclennan, Susan V., Elizabeth Fisher, Sally Y. Martell, Alison K. Death, Paul F. Williams, J. Guy Lyons, and Dennis K. Yue. "Effects of glucose on matrix metalloproteinase and plasmin activities in mesangial cells: possible role in diabetic nephropathy." Kidney International 58 (2000): S81-S87.

References

External links
 
 

Living people
New Zealand women academics
Academic staff of the University of Technology Sydney
University of Sydney alumni
Academic staff of the University of Otago
New Zealand physiologists
Year of birth missing (living people)
New Zealand women writers